Mildred Independent School District is a public school district based in Mildred, Texas (USA) and located in southeastern Navarro County, Texas.  The district has a Corsicana address since there is not a post office in Mildred.  In addition to Mildred, the district serves the cities of Eureka and Navarro.(j)

Schools
Mildred ISD has two campuses -(a)

Mildred High School (Grades 6-12)
Mildred Elementary School (Grades PK-5).

In 2009, the school district was rated "recognized" by the Texas Education Agency.(r)

References
(o)

External links
Mildred ISD(d)

School districts in Navarro County, Texas